Franklyn Rhem Atkinson (born December 13, 1941) is a former professional American football defensive lineman who played in the National Football League (NFL) and the American Football League (AFL). He played college football at Stanford University, where he was a defensive and offensive tackle. Frank Atkinson was the 108th overall pick in the 1963 NFL Draft, however, all Pittsburgh Steelers drafted ahead of him were either cut or traded before the start of the regular season making him the earliest draft pick to see the field.  Frank Atkinson went onto play 14 games for them in that season and was a starter at defensive tackle during the late season. He played in the inaugural Hall of Fame game in Canton, Ohio in 1963 and gained All-Rookie team mention.  He played in the AFL for the Denver Broncos in 1964.

See also
 List of American Football League players

References

1941 births
Living people
Players of American football from San Francisco
American football defensive tackles
American football defensive ends
Stanford Cardinal football players
Pittsburgh Steelers players
Denver Broncos (AFL) players